Mizuno Corp. currently sponsors a number of professional athletes and teams.

Badminton

Players
 Nozomi Okuhara

Baseball

Associations
Official Supplier:
 Baseball Canada
 Softball Canada
 Slo-Pitch National
Batting gloves official supplier: 
 Australian Baseball League – All teams

Clubs
 University of British Columbia
 University of Calgary
 Hiroshima Toyo Carp
 Orix Buffaloes
 Hokkaido Nippon-Ham Fighters
 Hanshin Tigers

Players

 Andruw Jones
 Andrelton Simmons
 Julio Lugo
 Emilio Bonifacio
 Alfonso Soriano
 Ichiro Suzuki
 Hideki Matsui
 Choo Shin-Soo
 Matt Cain
 Zach Duke
 Jeff Francoeur
 Tom Glavine
 Travis Hafner
 Corey Hart
 Todd Helton
 Chipper Jones
 Ian Kinsler
 Brian McCann
 Juan Pierre
 Scott Rolen
 John Smoltz
 Victor Martinez
 Adam Wainwright
 Billy Butler

Boxing

  Joichiro Tatsuyoshi
 Ricardo Lopez
 Yuri Arbachakov
 Yasuei Yakushiji
 Juan Manuel Márquez
 Marco Antonio Barrera
 Antonio Margarito
 Daisuke Naito
 Akira Yaegashi
 Kazuto Ioka
 Yota Sato
 Naoya Inoue
 Koki Eto
 Kosei Tanaka
 Yukinori Oguni
 Nonito Donaire

Figure Skating
 Shoma Uno

Football

Clubs

  Windsor F.C.
 Loyola F.C.
  Bochum (Since the 2022-2023 season)
  FC Augsburg  (From 2023 - 2024 season)
 Drava Ptuj
  Lazio (Since the 2022-2023 season)
 Montevarchi (Since the 2019–2020 season)
 Muravera
 Pavia  (Since the 2020–2021 season)
 Ponsacco (Since the 2018–2019 season)
 Porto d'Ascoli (Since the 2019–2020 season)
 Südtirol  (Since the 2020-2021 season)
 RG Ticino
 Varese (Since the 2018–2019 season)
 Brindisi (Since the 2022-2023 season)
 Chungnam Asan FC
 Hokkaido Consadole Sapporo 
 Ehime F.C.
 Nagoya Grampus
 Tokushima Vortis
 Ventforet Kofu
 Portimonense
 Tre Fiori 
 Tampines Rovers 
 Albirex Niigata Singapore
 Hoang Anh Gia Lai

Players

 Sergio Ramos
 Sandesh Jhingan
 Joseph Moran
 Ugur Deveci
  Djamel Mesbah
 Fernando Cavenaghi
 Dedé
 Fernandinho
 Jonas
 Eugenio Mena   
 Alexander Baumjohann
 Mongkol Tossakrai
 Anawin Jujeen
 Tanakorn Dangthong
 Pansa Hemviboon
 Pinyo Inpinit
 Wisarut Imura
 Sarayut Sompim
 Chanathip Songkrasin
 Tanaboon Kesarat
 Hendra Bayauw
 Pratama Arhan
 Andrea Dossena
 Carmine Ronzulli
 Giacomo Burdi
 Yuki Abe
 Keisuke Honda
 Akira Kaji
 Shohei Matsunaga
 Koki Mizuno
 Hidemasa Morita
 Ao Tanaka
 Reo Hatate
 Shinji Okazaki
 Yuichiro Nagai
 Kengo Nakamura
 Yūzō Tashiro
 Atsushi Yanagisawa
 Maya Yoshida
 Akihiro Ienaga
 Ryota Oshima
 Park Chu-Young
 Lee Jung-Soo
 Lee Keun-Ho
 Hernán López
 Lazar Marković
 Kenwyne Jones
 Zhambyl Kukeyev
 Chieffy Caligdong
 Anton del Rosario
 Alan Dzagoev
 Nghiêm Xuân Tú
 Đặng Văn Lâm
 Hà Đức Chinh
 Chris Philipps
 Oriol Riera
 Nick Cowburn
 Jacob Pepper
 Ciprian Tătăruşanu
 Alexandru Mitriță
 Dan Nistor

Notable former players

 Damián Manusovich
 Pablo Aimar
 Aldair
 Rivaldo
 David Platt
 John Beresford
 Thiago Motta
 Patrick Kluivert
 Adrian Mutu
 Cris
 Fernando Torres

Futsal

Club teams
 Thai Son Nam

Golf

PGA Tour 

 Keith Mitchell
 Luke Donald
 Adrien Saddier

LPGA Tour 

 Stacy Lewis

Ladies European Tour 

 Bettina Hauert

European Tour 

 Ricardo Gonzales
 Daniel Vancsik
 Chris Wood
 Luke Donald
 Robert Rock
 Sven Strüver
 Andrew McLardy
 Ignacio Garrido
 Carl Suneson

Olympic Committees
  Japan
 Taiwan (Since London 2012)
 Zimbawbe (Since London 2012)

Handball

National teams
 Czech Republic

Clubs
 Győri Audi ETO KC
 Herning-Ikast Håndbold
 SSV Brixen
 Pallamano Trieste
 Chambéry Savoy Handball
 ASUL Vaulx-en-Velin
 KH ISMM Kopřivnice

Rowing
 United Kingdom (since 2016)

Rugby Union

National Teams

Club teams
  Valorugby Emilia
  Blackheath F.C.

Players 

 Dan Norton

Running
 Team Mizuno Roadrunners AAU
 Jeremiah Godby
 Dylan Wykes
 Mohamad Affindi Nudin
 Syed Nurhafiz Syed Abdul Rahim
 Vaggelis Kontoulis
 Ross Braden

Swimming
 Natsumi Hoshi
 Yasuhiro Koseki
 Yui Ohashi
 Masato Sakai
 Aya Terakawa

Tennis
 Marcelo Arévalo
 Andrew Whittington
 Chanchai Sookton-eng
 Sam Groth
 Marc Polmans
 John-Patrick Smith
 Isabelle Wallace
 Storm Sanders
 Hugo Dellien
 Juan Sebastián Cabal
 Robert Farah
 Marcos Baghdatis
 Ivo Karlovic
 Ricardo Ojeda Lara
 Purav Raja
 Lorenzo Sonego
 Joe Salisbury
 Daniel Brands
 Philipp Kohlschreiber
 Marius Copil
 Blaz Rola
 Malek Jaziri
 Julia Elbaba
 Tennys Sandgren
 Martin Cuevas
Bernard Tomic 
Roberto Bautista Agut (Shoes Only)
Guillermo Garcia-Lopez (Shoes Only)

Athletics

National teams
  Chinese Taipei
  Mongolia
  Namibia
  Uzbekistan

Athletes

 Leevan Sands
 Trevor Barry
 Andrae Williams
 Derrick Atkins
 Ramon Miller
 Adrian Griffith
 Michael Mathieu
 Shakera Reece
 Mike Mason
 Kemar Hyman
 Nery Brenes
 Meseret Defar
 Martial Mbandjock

 Luke Lennon-Ford
 Tasha Danvers
 Louise Hazel
 Konstadínos Filippídis
 Samyr Laine
 Madarász Viktória
 Gábossy Alex
 Fabrizio Donato
 Shota Iizuka
 Yukifumi Murakami
 Koji Murofushi
 Shingo Suetsugu
 Keisuke Ushiro
 Julius Yego
 Tosin Oke
 Francis Obikwelu
 Eric Alejandro
 Levern Spencer
 Godfrey Khotso Mokoena
 Dana Velďáková
 Jana Velďáková
 Dilshod Nazarov
 Ryan Wilson
 Tabarie Henry
 Brian Dzingai

Volleyball

Associations and Leagues 
 Fédération Internationale (FIVB)

National Teams 
 Men / Women
 Men / Women
 Men / Women
 Women
 Men /  Women
 Men /  Women
  Women
 Men /  Women
 Men /  Women
 Men /  Women

NCAA Colleges 

 Loyola of Chicago
 Duke
 Wichita State
 Georgia Tech
 LSU
 Central Connecticut State University
 Long Beach State
 Rice

Clubs 
 UBC
 McMaster University
 University of Saskatchewan
  Volley Club Marcq-en-Barœul
  Vandœuvre Nancy Volley-Ball
 Vasas SC
 Lardini Filottrano
  Wealth Perugia  (From 2022 - 2023 season)
  Pinerolo  (From 2022 - 2023 season)
 :it: Volley Tricolore Reggio Emilia
 Dynamo Moscow (female)
 Supreme Chonburi-E.Tech
VC United
Calne Comets Volleyball Club

Players 
 Pleumjit Thinkaow
 Wilavan Apinyapong
 Ajcharaporn Kongyot
 Thatdao Nuekjang
 Piyanut Pannoy

Artists
 EXID

References

Mizuno